The Catamayo River is a river in Ecuador. It is one of the most important rivers in the Loja Province. It flows into the Pacific Ocean.

See also
List of rivers of Ecuador

References
 Rand McNally, The New International Atlas, 1993.
  GEOnet Names Server 
 Water Resources Assessment of Ecuador

Rivers of Ecuador
Geography of Loja Province